William John Browne ffolkes (13 January 1820 – 16 November 1867) was an English first-class cricketer.

ffolkes was born at Hillington Hall in Norfolk in October 1894, to Charlotte Philippa Browne and her husband, Sir William ffolkes. He was educated at Harrow School. ffolkes made two appearances in first-class cricket, both for the West of England in 1845. Both matches came against the Marylebone Cricket Club, with the first played at Lord's in June, and the second played at Cricket Down, Bath. He worked as the Secretary to the Chairman of the Inland Revenue. He died at Marylebone in November 1867.

References

External links
William ffolkes at ESPNcricinfo
William ffolkes at CricketArchive

1820 births
1867 deaths
People from Hillington, Norfolk
People educated at Harrow School
English cricketers
West of England cricketers
British civil servants